The Hyundai Xcent is a subcompact car produced by the South Korean manufacturer Hyundai. Based on the Hyundai Grand i10, the Xcent is a sedan manufactured by Hyundai Motor India Limited in Chennai. It is also sold in markets outside India as the Hyundai Grand i10 Sedan.

Marketing
In September 2014, Indian actor Shah Rukh Khan has signed with Hyundai Motors India to be the brand ambassador for the Xcent.

Discontinuation
In June 2019, Hyundai Motor India has confirmed that the production of the Xcent would be stopped permanently by 2020 in India, the reason being that the Xcent nameplate was being used for taxi purposes. The Xcent would be replaced by the Hyundai Aura in 2020. The Xcent would be sold alongside the Aura as a fleet sales only.

Gallery

References

External links

2010s cars
Front-wheel-drive vehicles
Xcent
Xcent
Subcompact cars
Cars introduced in 2014